Votava (feminine Votavová) is a Czech surname. Notable people with the surname include:

 Miroslav Votava (born 1956), German footballer and coach
 Olga Votavová (born 1966), Czech tennis player
 Tomáš Votava (born 1974), Czech footballer

Czech-language surnames